Radio Posušje is a Hercegovina local public radio station, broadcasting from Posušje, Bosnia and Herzegovina.

Radio Posušje was launched in 1984.

Frequencies
The program is currently broadcast on 4 frequencies:

 Posušje  
 Rakitno  
 Blidinje  
 Mostar

See also 
List of radio stations in Bosnia and Herzegovina

References

External links 
 www.radioposusje.ba
 Communications Regulatory Agency of Bosnia and Herzegovina

Posušje
Radio stations established in 1984